Muppet Babies is an American animated television series produced by The Muppets Studio and Oddbot Animation that began airing on Disney Junior and Disney Channel on March 23, 2018. It is a reboot of the original 1984–1991 animated series of the same name, that was originally produced by Jim Henson Productions and Marvel Productions.

Series overview

Episodes

Season 1 (2018–19)

Special (2018)

Season 2 (2019–20)
NOTE: Beginning with this season, title cards are now discontinued, but they can still be heard.

Season 3 (2021–22)

Shorts

Muppet Babies Show and Tell
These shorts aired on March 2, 2018.

Muppet Babies Play Date

The Muppets Information

Muppet Babies (1984 TV series)
Wikipedia Link

References

External links

The Cable Forum - Disney Junior

Muppet Babies
The Muppets television series